Spratt is an unincorporated community in Muskingum County, in the U.S. state of Ohio.

History
A post office called Spratt was established in 1884, and remained in operation until 1955. Besides the post office, Spratt had a station on the Bellaire, Zanesville and Cincinnati Railroad.

References

Unincorporated communities in Muskingum County, Ohio
1884 establishments in Ohio
Populated places established in 1884
Unincorporated communities in Ohio